Walace Souza Silva (born 4 April 1995), or simply Walace, is a Brazilian professional footballer who plays as a defensive midfielder for  club Udinese.

Club career

Grêmio
Born in Salvador, Bahia, Walace started his youth career with the academy of amateur Simões Filho Futebol Clube. While playing in a cup, he caught the eye of a scout of Avaí Futebol Clube and subsequently joined the club in the next year. However, he was soon loaned to the under-23 team of Esporte Clube Bahia in the same year. In 2013, Walace joined the under-18 team of Grêmio.

Walace was promoted to the senior squad of the club in 2014 by manager Enderson Moreira. On 27 April, he made his first team debut against Atlético Mineiro. In August, he made his first start for the club in a 2–0 defeat against Sport Club Internacional, where he was assigned to mark Andrés D'Alessandro. At the end of the season, media reports suggested that Italian club SSC Napoli, Portuguese clubs FC Porto and S.L. Benfica expressed their interest to sign him.

After the appointment of Roger Machado as the club's manager in 2015, Walace became an undisputed starter for the club. In June, Grêmio rejected an offer from Swiss club FC Basel to secure his services. On 5 October, his contract was extended till 2018. In July 2016, he scored his first league goal in a 2–1 victory over Figueirense Futebol Clube.

Hamburger SV
On 31 January 2017, Walace moved to German club Hamburger SV, signing a contract until 2021. Eleven days later, he scored his first goal in a 3–0 victory against RB Leipzig.

Hannover 96
In June 2018, Walace joined league rivals Hannover 96 on a four-year contract until 2022. The transfer fee paid to Hamburger SV was estimated at €6 million with 10% of the fee going to former club Grêmio.

International career
In June 2016, Walace was called by Dunga to the senior international squad for the 2016 Copa America as a replacement for Luiz Gustavo (who left the squad citing personal reasons). He featured once in the tournament, in a 7–1 victory against Haiti.
 
In the next month, Walace was called to the Brazil under-23 squad for the 2016 Summer Olympics to be held at the month of August. He came as a replacement for Fred, whose club FC Shakhtar Donetsk refused to release him for the tournament. He featured four times in the tournament, with his side emerging as the winner.

Career statistics

Honours

Club
Grêmio
Copa do Brasil: 2016

International
Brazil
Olympic Gold Medal: 2016

References

External links
Walace profile. Portal Oficial do Grêmio.

1995 births
Living people
Sportspeople from Salvador, Bahia
Association football midfielders
Brazilian footballers
Brazilian expatriate footballers
Brazil youth international footballers
Brazil international footballers
Brazilian expatriate sportspeople in Germany
Campeonato Brasileiro Série A players
Bundesliga players
Serie A players
Grêmio Foot-Ball Porto Alegrense players
Hamburger SV players
Hannover 96 players
Udinese Calcio players
2015 South American Youth Football Championship players
Expatriate footballers in Germany
Expatriate footballers in Italy
Copa América Centenario players
Olympic footballers of Brazil
Footballers at the 2016 Summer Olympics
Olympic gold medalists for Brazil
Medalists at the 2016 Summer Olympics
Olympic medalists in football